Ramarajyamlo Bheemaraju is a 1983 Indian Telugu-language action film, produced by Midde Rama Rao under the Sri Rajyalakshmi Art Pictures banner and directed by A. Kodandarami Reddy. It stars Krishna and Sridevi, with music composed by Chakravarthy.

Cast

Krishna as Bheemaraju / Krishna Raja Kumar
Sridevi as Jyothi
Rao Gopal Rao as Ramaraju
Satyanarayana as Lakshmipathi
Allu Ramalingaiah as Kailasam
Jaggayya as Raghupati Raja
Chandra Mohan as Ramudu
Rajendra Prasad as Satish
Suthi Veerabhadra Rao as Veerabhadraiah
Suthi Velu as Kanaka Rao
Rallapalli as Rajaiah
KK Sarma as Priest
Chalapathi Rao as Polaiah
Mallikarjuna Rao as Rangadu
Sangeeta as Sundari
Sivaranjani as Seeta
Nirmalamma as Suvachala

Crew
Art: A. Sai Kumar
Choreography: Saleem
Stills: Sabastian Brothers
Fights: Parama Sivam, Raju
Dialogues: Satyanand 
Lyrics: Veturi
Playback: S. P. Balasubrahmanyam, P. Susheela, S. P. Sailaja
Music: Chakravarthy
Story: Vasundhara
Editing: D. Venkataratnam
Cinematography: A. Venkat
Producer: Midde Rama Rao
Screenplay - Director: A. Kodandarami Reddy
Banner: Sri Rajyalakshmi Art Pictures
Release Date: 28 July 1983

Soundtrack

Music composed by Chakravarthy. Lyrics were written by Veturi.

References

External links
 

Indian action films
Films directed by A. Kodandarami Reddy
Films scored by K. Chakravarthy
1983 action films
1983 films